Milhous(e) may refer to:

 Katherine Milhous (1894–1977), newspaper illustrator
 David Milhous (born 1967), film editor
 Richard Milhous Nixon (1913–1994), thirty-seventh president of the United States
 Hannah Milhous Nixon (1885–1967), mother of President Richard Milhous Nixon
 Milhouse Van Houten, character from The Simpsons

See also
 Millhouse (disambiguation)